The Delta Kappa Epsilon fraternity has 56 active chapters and 5 active colonies.  It was originally established at Yale University with the Phi chapter in 1844.

Of a total of 56 active chapters, 49 are in the United States, while seven are in Canada – at the University of Toronto, McGill University, the University of British Columbia, the University of Manitoba, the University of Alberta, the University of Victoria, and Simon Fraser University. There are five additional active colonies in North America.

Naming confusion
Delta Kappa Epsilon, as one of the antebellum, or pre-Civil War fraternities, expanded quite early into southern schools that would temporarily, or in some cases permanently, close as a result of the war. Today's standard protocol whereby GLO chapter names were reserved for their schools of origin -- even if the chapters were dormant—had not yet gained traction as a standard rule. Hence, 's early chapter names were often reassigned. In this table, where a chapter name was used at multiple schools for multiple years, they are listed here, and numbered. Where a name was transitory, the early name(s) are only noted in the reference notes.

Chapters
These are the chapters of Delta Kappa Epsilon in order of establishment.  Active chapters and colonies noted in bold, inactive chapters (and inactive schools) noted in italics.  Several early chapters reused names of chapters closed during the Civil War, but this practice has been discontinued.

Notes

References

Delta Kappa Epsilon
chapters